Health threats from cosmic rays are the dangers posed by cosmic rays to astronauts on interplanetary missions or any missions that venture through the Van-Allen Belts or outside the Earth's magnetosphere. They are one of the greatest barriers standing in the way of plans for interplanetary travel by crewed spacecraft,
but space radiation health risks also occur for missions in low Earth orbit such as the International Space Station (ISS).

In October 2015, the NASA Office of Inspector General issued a health hazards report related to space exploration, including a human mission to Mars.

The deep-space radiation environment

The radiation environment of deep space is different from that on the Earth's surface or in low Earth orbit, due to the much larger flux of high-energy galactic cosmic rays (GCRs), along with radiation from solar proton events (SPEs) and the radiation belts.

Galactic cosmic rays (GCRs) consist of high energy protons (85%), alpha particles (14%) and other high energy nuclei (HZE ions). Solar energetic particles consist primarily of protons accelerated by the Sun to high energies via proximity to solar flares and coronal mass ejections. 
Heavy ions and low energy protons and helium particles are highly ionizing forms of radiation, which produce distinct biological damage compared to X-rays and gamma-rays. Microscopic energy deposition from highly ionizing particles consists of a core radiation track due to direct ionizations by the particle and low energy electrons produced in ionization, and a penumbra of higher energy electrons that may extend hundreds of microns from the particles path in tissue. The core track produces extremely large clusters of ionizations within a few nanometres, which is qualitatively distinct from energy deposition by X-rays and gamma rays; hence human epidemiology data which only exists for these latter forms of radiation is limited in predicting the health risks from space radiation to astronauts.

The radiation belts are within Earth's magnetosphere and do not occur in deep space, while organ dose equivalents on the International Space Station are dominated by GCR not trapped radiation. Microscopic energy deposition in cells and tissues is distinct for GCR compared to X-rays on Earth, leading to both qualitative and quantitative differences in biological effects, while there is no human epidemiology data for GCR for cancer and other fatal risks.

The solar cycle is an approximately 11-year period of varying solar activity including solar maximum where the solar wind is strongest and solar minimum where the solar wind is weakest. Galactic cosmic rays create a continuous radiation dose throughout the Solar System that increases during solar minimum and decreases during solar maximum (solar activity). The inner and outer radiation belts are two regions of trapped particles from the solar wind that are later accelerated by dynamic interaction with the Earth's magnetic field. While always high, the radiation dose in these belts can increase dramatically during geomagnetic storms and substorms. Solar proton events (SPEs) are bursts of energetic protons accelerated by the Sun. They occur relatively rarely and can produce extremely high radiation levels. Without thick shielding, SPEs are sufficiently strong to cause acute radiation poisoning and death.

Life on the Earth's surface is protected from galactic cosmic rays by a number of factors:
 The Earth's atmosphere is opaque to primary cosmic rays with energies below about 1 gigaelectron volt (GeV), so only secondary radiation can reach the surface. The secondary radiation is also attenuated by absorption in the atmosphere, as well as by radioactive decay in flight of some particles, such as muons. Particles entering from a direction far from the zenith are especially attenuated. The world's population receives an average of 0.4 millisieverts (mSv) of cosmic radiation annually (separate from other sources of radiation exposure like inhaled radon) due to atmospheric shielding. At 12 km altitude, above most of the atmosphere's protection, radiation as an annual rate rises to 20 mSv at the equator to 50–120 mSv at the poles, varying between solar maximum and minimum conditions.
 Missions beyond low Earth orbit transit the Van Allen radiation belts. Thus they may need to be shielded against exposure to cosmic rays, Van Allen radiation, or solar flares. The region between two and four Earth radii lies between the two radiation belts and is sometimes referred to as the "safe zone". See the implications of the Van Allen belts for space travel for more information.
 The interplanetary magnetic field, embedded in the solar wind, also deflects cosmic rays. As a result, cosmic ray fluxes within the heliopause are inversely correlated with the solar cycle.
 Electromagnetic radiation created by lightning in clouds only a few miles high can create a safe zone in the Van Allen radiation belts that surround the earth. This zone, known as the "Van Allen Belt slot", may be a safe haven for satellites in medium Earth orbits (MEOs), protecting them from the Sun's intense radiation.

As a result, the energy input of GCRs to the atmosphere is negligible – about 10−9 of solar radiation – roughly the same as starlight.

Of the above factors, all but the first one apply to low Earth orbit craft, such as the Space Shuttle and the International Space Station. Exposures on the ISS average 150 mSv per year, although frequent crew rotations minimize individual risk. Astronauts on Apollo and Skylab missions received on average 1.2 mSv/day and 1.4 mSv/day respectively. Since the durations of the Apollo and Skylab missions were days and months, respectively, rather than years, the doses involved were smaller than would be expected on future long-term missions such as to a near-Earth asteroid or to Mars (unless far more shielding could be provided).

On 31 May 2013, NASA scientists reported that a possible human mission to Mars may involve a great radiation risk based on the amount of energetic particle radiation detected by the radiation assessment detector (RAD) on the Mars Science Laboratory while traveling from the Earth to Mars in 2011–2012. However, the absorbed dose and dose equivalent for a Mars mission were predicted in the early 1990s by Badhwar, Cucinotta, and others (see for example Badhwar, Cucinotta et al., Radiation Research vol. 138, 201–208, 1994) and the result of the MSL experiment are to a large extent consistent with these earlier predictions.

Human health effects

The potential acute and chronic health effects of space radiation, as with other ionizing radiation exposures, involve both direct damage to DNA, indirect effects due to generation of reactive oxygen species, and changes to the biochemistry of cells and tissues, which can alter gene transcription and the tissue microenvironment along with producing DNA mutations. Acute (or early radiation) effects result from high radiation doses, and these are most likely to occur after solar particle events (SPEs). Likely chronic effects of space radiation exposure include both stochastic events such as radiation carcinogenesis and deterministic degenerative tissue effects. To date, however, the only pathology associated with space radiation exposure is a higher risk for radiation cataract among the astronaut corps.

The health threat depends on the flux, energy spectrum, and nuclear composition of the radiation. The flux and energy spectrum depend on a variety of factors: short-term solar weather, long-term trends (such as an apparent increase since the 1950s), and position in the Sun's magnetic field. These factors are incompletely understood.
The Mars Radiation Environment Experiment (MARIE) was launched in 2001 in order to collect more data.
Estimates are that humans unshielded in interplanetary space would receive annually roughly 400 to 900 mSv (compared to 2.4 mSv on Earth) and that a Mars mission (12 months in flight and 18 months on Mars) might expose shielded astronauts to roughly 500 to 1000 mSv. These doses approach the 1 to 4 Sv career limits advised by the National Council on Radiation Protection and Measurements (NCRP) for low Earth orbit activities in 1989, and the more recent NCRP recommendations of 0.5 to 2 Sv in 2000 based on updated information on dose to risk conversion factors. Dose limits depend on age at exposure and sex due to difference in susceptibility with age, the added risks of breast and ovarian cancers to women, and the variability of cancer risks such as lung cancer between men and women. A 2017 laboratory study on mice, estimates that the risk of developing cancer due to galactic cosmic rays (GCR) radiation exposure after a Mars mission could be two times greater than what scientists previously thought.

The quantitative biological effects of cosmic rays are poorly known, and are the subject of ongoing research. Several experiments, both in space and on Earth, are being carried out to evaluate the exact degree of danger. Additionally, the impact of the space microgravity environment on DNA repair has in part confounded the interpretation of some results. Experiments over the last 10 years have shown results both higher and lower than predicted by current quality factors used in radiation protection, indicating large uncertainties exist. Experiments in 2007 at Brookhaven National Laboratory's NASA Space Radiation Laboratory (NSRL) suggest that biological damage due to a given exposure is actually about half what was previously estimated: specifically, it suggested that low energy protons cause more damage than high energy ones. This was explained by the fact that slower particles have more time to interact with molecules in the body. This may be interpreted as an acceptable result for space travel as the cells affected end up with greater energy deposition and are more likely to die without proliferating into tumors. This is in contrast to the current dogma on radiation exposure to human cells which considers lower energy radiation of higher weighting factor for tumor formation. Relative biological effectiveness (RBE) depends on radiation type described by particle charge number, Z, and kinetic energy per amu, E, and varies with tumor type with limited experimental data suggesting leukemia's having the lowest RBE, liver tumors the highest RBE, and limited or no experimental data on RBE available for cancers that dominate human cancer risks including lung, stomach, breast, and bladder cancers. Studies of Harderian gland tumors in a single strain of female mice with several heavy ions have been made, however it is not clear how well the RBE for this tumor type represents the RBE for human cancers such as lung, stomach, breast and bladder cancers nor how RBE changes with sex and genetic background.

Part of the ISS year long mission is to determine the health impacts of cosmic ray exposure over the course of one year spent aboard the International Space Station. However, sample sizes for accurately estimating health risks directly from crew observations for the risks of concern (cancer, cataracts, cognitive and memory changes, late CNS risks, circulatory diseases, etc.) are large (typically >>10 persons) and necessarily involve long post-mission observation times (>10 years). The small number of astronauts on the ISS and the limited length of missions puts statistical limits on how accurate risk predictions can be. Hence the need for ground-based research to predict cosmic ray health risks. In addition, radiation safety requirements mandate that risks should be adequately understood prior to astronauts incurring significant risks, and methods developed to mitigate the risks if necessary.

Noting these limitations, a study published in Scientific Reports looked over 301 U.S. astronauts and 117 Soviet and Russian cosmonauts, and found no measurable increase in cancer mortality compared to the general population over time. An earlier 1998 study came to similar conclusions, with no statistically significant increase in cancer among astronauts compared to the reference group. See spaceflight radiation carcinogenesis for further details on cancer risks.

Central nervous system 

Hypothetical early and late effects on the central nervous system are of great concern to NASA and an area of active current research interest. It is postulated short- and long-term effects of CNS exposure to galactic cosmic radiation are likely to pose significant neurological health risks to human long-term space travel. Estimates suggest considerable exposure to high energy heavy (HZE) ions as well as protons and secondary radiation during Mars or prolonged Lunar missions with estimates of whole body effective doses ranging from 0.17 to greater than 1.0 Sv. Given the high linear energy transfer potential of such particles, a considerable proportion of those cells exposed to HZE radiation are likely to die. Based on calculations of heavy ion fluences during space flight as well as various experimental cell models, as many as 5% of an astronaut's cells might be killed during such missions. With respect to cells in critical brain regions, as many as 13% of such cells may be traversed at least once by an iron ion during a three-year Mars mission. Several Apollo astronauts reported seeing light flashes, although the precise biological mechanisms responsible are unclear. Likely pathways include heavy ion interactions with retinal photoreceptors and Cherenkov radiation resulting from particle interactions within the vitreous humor. This phenomenon has been replicated on Earth by scientists at various institutions. As the duration of the longest Apollo flights was less than two weeks, the astronauts had limited cumulative exposures and a corresponding low risk for radiation carcinogenesis. In addition, there were only 24 such astronauts, making statistical analysis of any potential health effects problematic.

In the above discussion dose equivalents is units of Sievert (Sv) are noted, however the Sv is a unit for comparing cancer risks for different types of ionizing radiation. For CNS effects absorbed doses in Gy are more useful, while the RBE for CNS effects is poorly understood. Furthermore, stating "hypothetical" risk is problematic, while space radiation CNS risk estimates have largely focused on early and late detriments to memory and cognition (e.g. Cucinotta, Alp, Sulzman, and Wang, Life Sciences in Space Research, 2014).

On 31 December 2012, a NASA-supported study reported that human spaceflight may harm the brains of astronauts and accelerate the onset of Alzheimer's disease. This research is problematic due to many factors, inclusive of the intensity of which mice were exposed to radiation which far exceeds normal mission rates.

A review of CNS space radiobiology by Cucinotta, Alp, Sulzman, and Wang (Life Sciences in Space Research, 2014) summarizes research studies in small animals of changes to cognition and memory, neuro-inflammation, neuron morphology, and impaired neurogenesis in the hippocampus. Studies using simulated space radiation in small animals suggest temporary or long-term cognitive detriments could occur during a long-term space mission. Changes to neuron morphology in mouse hippocampus and pre-frontal cortex occur for heavy ions at low doses (<0.3 Gy). Studies in mice and rats of chronic neuro-inflammation and behavioral changes show variable results at low doses (~0.1 Gy or lower). Further research is needed to understand if such cognitive detriments induced by space radiation would occur in astronauts and whether they would negatively impact a Mars mission.

The cumulative heavy ion doses in space are low such that critical cells and cell components will receive only 0 or 1 particle traversal. The cumulative heavy ion dose for a Mars mission near solar minimum would be ~0.05 Gy and lower for missions at other times in the solar cycle. This suggests dose-rate effects will not occur for heavy ions as long as the total doses used in experimental studies in reasonably small (<~0.1 Gy). At larger doses (>~0.1 Gy) critical cells and cell components could receive more than one particle traversal, which is not reflective of the deep space environment for extended duration missions such as a mission to Mars. An alternative assumption would be if a tissue's micro-environment is modified by a long-range signaling effect or change to biochemistry, whereby a particle traversal to some cells modifies the response of other cells not traversed by particles. There is limited experimental evidence, especially for central nervous system effects, available to evaluate this alternative assumption.

Prevention

Spacecraft shielding

Material shielding can be effective against galactic cosmic rays, but thin shielding may actually make the problem worse for some of the higher energy rays, because more shielding causes an increased amount of secondary radiation, although thick shielding could counter such too. The aluminium walls of the ISS, for example, are believed to produce a net reduction in radiation exposure. In interplanetary space, however, it is believed that thin aluminium shielding would give a net increase in radiation exposure but would gradually decrease as more shielding is added to capture generated secondary radiation.

Studies of space radiation shielding should include tissue or water equivalent shielding along with the shielding material under study. This observation is readily understood by noting that the average tissue self-shielding of sensitive organs is about 10 cm, and that secondary radiation produced in tissue such as low energy protons, helium and heavy ions are of high linear energy transfer (LET) and make significant contributions (>25%) to the overall biological damage from GCR. Studies of aluminum, polyethylene, liquid hydrogen, or other shielding materials, will involve secondary radiation not reflective of secondary radiation produced in tissue, hence the need to include tissue equivalent shielding in studies of space radiation shielding effectiveness.

Several strategies are being studied for ameliorating the effects of this radiation hazard for planned human interplanetary spaceflight:
 Spacecraft can be constructed out of hydrogen-rich plastics, rather than aluminium.
 Material shielding has been considered:
 Liquid hydrogen, often used as fuel, tends to give relatively good shielding, while producing relatively low levels of secondary radiation. Therefore, the fuel could be placed so as to act as a form of shielding around the crew. However, as fuel is consumed by the craft, the crew's shielding decreases.
 Water, which is necessary to sustain life, could also contribute to shielding. But it too is consumed during the journey unless waste products are utilized.
 Asteroids could serve to provide shielding.
 Light active radiation shields based on the charged graphene against gamma rays, where the absorption parameters can be controlled by the negative charge accumulation.
 Magnetic deflection of charged radiation particles and/or electrostatic repulsion is a hypothetical alternative to pure conventional mass shielding under investigation. In theory, power requirements for a 5-meter torus drop from an excessive 10 GW for a simple pure electrostatic shield (too discharged by space electrons) to a moderate 10 kilowatts (kW) by using a hybrid design. However, such complex active shielding is untried, with workability and practicalities more uncertain than material shielding.

Special provisions would also be necessary to protect against a solar proton event, which could increase fluxes to levels that would kill a crew in hours or days rather than months or years. Potential mitigation strategies include providing a small habitable space behind a spacecraft's water supply or with particularly thick walls or providing an option to abort to the protective environment provided by the Earth's magnetosphere. The Apollo mission used a combination of both strategies. Upon receiving confirmation of an SPE, astronauts would move to the Command Module, which had thicker aluminium walls than the Lunar Module, then return to Earth. It was later determined from measurements taken by instruments flown on Apollo that the Command Module would have provided sufficient shielding to prevent significant crew harm.

None of these strategies currently provide a method of protection that would be known to be sufficient while conforming to likely limitations on the mass of the payload at present (around $10,000/kg) launch prices. Scientists such as University of Chicago professor emeritus Eugene Parker are not optimistic it can be solved anytime soon. For passive mass shielding, the required amount could be too heavy to be affordably lifted into space without changes in economics (like hypothetical non-rocket spacelaunch or usage of extraterrestrial resources) — many hundreds of metric tons for a reasonably-sized crew compartment. For instance, a NASA design study for an ambitious large space station envisioned 4 metric tons per square meter of shielding to drop radiation exposure to 2.5 mSv annually (± a factor of 2 uncertainty), less than the tens of milli sieverts or more in some populated high natural background radiation areas on Earth, but the sheer mass for that level of mitigation was considered practical only because it involved first building a lunar mass driver to launch material.

Several active shielding methods have been considered that might be less massive than passive shielding, but they remain speculative. Since the type of radiation penetrating farthest through thick material shielding, deep in interplanetary space, is GeV positively charged nuclei, a repulsive electrostatic field has been proposed, but this has problems including plasma instabilities and the power needed for an accelerator constantly keeping the charge from being neutralized by deep-space electrons. A more common proposal is magnetic shielding generated by superconductors (or plasma currents). Among the difficulties with this proposal is that, for a compact system, magnetic fields up to 10–20 teslas could be required around a crewed spacecraft, higher than the several teslas in MRI machines. Such high fields can produce headaches and migraines in MRI patients, and long-duration exposure to such fields has not been studied. Opposing-electromagnet designs might cancel the field in the crew sections of the spacecraft, but would require more mass. It is also possible to use a combination of a magnetic field with an electrostatic field, with the spacecraft having zero total charge. The hybrid design would theoretically ameliorate the problems, but would be complex and possibly infeasible.

Part of the uncertainty is that the effect of human exposure to galactic cosmic rays is poorly known in quantitative terms. The NASA Space Radiation Laboratory is currently studying the effects of radiation in living organisms as well as protective shielding.

Wearable radiation shielding 
Apart from passive and active radiation shielding methods, which focus on protecting the spacecraft from harmful space radiation, there has been much interest in designing personalized radiation protective suits for astronauts. The reason behind choosing such methods of radiation shielding is that in passive shielding, adding a certain thickness to the spacecraft can increase the mass of the spacecraft by several thousands of kilograms. This mass can surpass the launch constraints and costs several millions of dollars. On the other hand, active radiation shielding methods is an emerging technology which is still far away in terms of testing and implementation. Even with the simultaneous use of active and passive shielding, wearable protective shielding may be useful, especially in reducing the health effects of SPEs, which generally are composed of particles that have a lower penetrating force than GCR particles. The materials suggested for this  type of protective equipment is often  polyethylene or other hydrogen rich polymers. Water has also been suggested as a shielding material. The limitation with wearable protective solutions is that they need to be ergonomically compatible with crew needs such as movement inside crew volume.  One attempt at creating wearable protection for space radiation was done by the Italian Space Agency, where a garment was proposed that could be filled with recycled water on the signal of incoming SPE. A collaborative effort between the Israeli Space Agency, StemRad and Lockheed Martin was AstroRad, tested aboard the ISS. The product is designed as an ergonomically suitable protective vest, which can minimize the effective dose by SPE to an extent similar to onboard storm shelters. It also has potential to mildly reduce the effective dose of GCR through extensive use during the mission during such routine activities such as sleeping. This radiation protective garment uses selective shielding methods to protect most radiation-sensitive organs such as BFO, stomach, lungs, and other internal organs, thereby reducing the mass penalty and launch cost.

Drugs and medicine
Another line of research is the development of drugs that enhance the body's natural capacity to repair damage caused by radiation. Some of the drugs that are being considered are retinoids, which are vitamins with antioxidant properties, and molecules that retard cell division, giving the body time to fix damage before harmful mutations can be duplicated.

It has also been suggested that only through substantial improvements and modifications could the human body endure the conditions of space travel. While not constrained by basic laws of nature in the way technical solutions are, this is far beyond current science of medicine. See transhumanism.

Timing of missions

Due to the potential negative effects of astronaut exposure to cosmic rays, solar activity may play a role in future space travel. Because galactic cosmic ray fluxes within the Solar System are lower during periods of strong solar activity, interplanetary travel during solar maximum should minimize the average dose to astronauts.

Although the Forbush decrease effect during coronal mass ejections can temporarily lower the flux of galactic cosmic rays, the short duration of the effect (1–3 days) and the approximately 1% chance that a CME generates a dangerous solar proton event limits the utility of timing missions to coincide with CMEs.

Orbital selection

Radiation dosage from the Earth's radiation belts is typically mitigated by selecting orbits that avoid the belts or pass through them relatively quickly. For example, a low Earth orbit, with low inclination, will generally be below the inner belt.

The orbits of the Earth-Moon system Lagrange points  -  take them out of the protection of the Earth's magnetosphere for approximately two-thirds of the time.

The orbits of Earth-Sun system Lagrange Points  and  -  are always outside the protection of the Earth's magnetosphere.

See also

Electromagnetic radiation and health
Background radiation
Effect of spaceflight on the human body
Heliosphere
Lagrange point colonization
List of microorganisms tested in outer space
Magnetosphere
NASA Space Radiation Laboratory
Proton: Human exposure
Solar flare: Hazards
Solar proton event
Solar wind
Space medicine
Van Allen belt
Central nervous system effects from radiation exposure during spaceflight

References

External links
The Health Risks of Extraterrestrial Environments - an encyclopedic site
Booster Accelerator at Brookhaven National Laboratory.
Space Radiation Laboratory  at BNL.

Cosmic rays
Human spaceflight
Radiation health effects
Space medicine
Spaceflight health effects